Wish Upon is a 2017 American supernatural horror film, directed by John R. Leonetti, written by Barbara Marshall, and starring Joey King, Ki Hong Lee, Sydney Park, Shannon Purser, Sherilyn Fenn, Elisabeth Rohm, and Ryan Phillippe. The film follows a teenage girl who is given a magic musicbox that grants seven wishes, but kills someone close to her each time it does.

The film was theatrically released on July 14, 2017, by Broad Green Pictures and Orion Pictures. It received negative reviews from critics and grossed $23.5 million worldwide against a $12 million budget.

Plot 

Clare Shannon, a seventeen-year-old high school outcast, is haunted by the memory of her mother's suicide that she witnessed as a young child.

Her father, Jonathan, who becomes a hoarder and dumpster diver, finds a Chinese music box and gives it to Clare. Clare deciphers one of the inscriptions on the box as "Seven Wishes," and absentmindedly wishes for Darcie, her school tormentor, to "rot," at which point Darcie develops necrotizing fasciitis. That same day, Clare's dog Max dies in her house's crawlspace. Clare deduces the box grants wishes.

Clare makes a second wish that a popular boy named Paul will reciprocate her affection; Paul falls madly in love with her. Clare’s wealthy great-uncle dies. Hearing this, Clare wishes to be in his will, which rewrites itself and leaves everything to Clare. Consequently, friendly neighbor Mrs. Deluca perishes as her hair gets caught in the kitchen waste disposal, breaking her neck.

Clare enlists the help of her Asian classmate, Ryan Hui, to decipher the symbols on the box. His cousin Gina is able to decipher that each of the seven wishes comes with consequences. They now understand the link of wishes to catastrophes. The trio's research reveals the box belonged to a Chinese woman named Lu Mei; during a 1910 outbreak of bubonic plague in China, Mei’s family was forcibly quarantined in a railroad car where all but Mei died. Mei prayed for revenge at a temple and offered up her family’s only valuable heirloom, the music box, as a sacrifice, at which point a demonic Yaoguai spirit cursed the music box. After using the box to get her revenge, Mei committed suicide, with the box later passing through a string of owners, all suffering tragic fates.

Gina emails the text to an associate for help with the deciphering. Clare makes a fourth wish that her father will stop dumpster diving; he immediately has a personality shift. Soon after, Gina and her associate decipher the meaning of the final phrase: "When the music ends, the blood price is paid." Before she can warn Ryan, Gina is impaled and dies. After Ryan finds Gina's body, he confronts Clare about making a wish, which she denies.

Clare makes a fifth wish that she be popular, but is soon unhappy with the consequent attention and losing her relationship with her old friends, Meredith and June. Shortly afterwards, Meredith dies when the elevator she's in plummets many floors.

While comforting Clare, Ryan reveals that after the seventh wish, the Yaoguai will claim the soul of the box’s owner. They go to her house and unsuccessfully try to destroy the box. Clare hides the box in an air vent. Her friend June steals the box, knowing Clare won’t get rid of it. Per the rules of the wishes, Clare loses everything she had wished for. When Clare wrestles the box back from June, she causes June to fall down a staircase to serious injury.

Clare refuses to abandon the box and her sixth wish is that her mother never committed suicide. Clare's mom knocks on her bedroom door, along with two younger sisters who didn’t previously exist.

While rummaging through her mom's paintings, Clare finds a picture of the music box. She concludes that her mom was a previous owner, leading to her suicide. Clare runs outside to warn her father to move away from his friend Carl, who is removing a tree branch with a chainsaw. When Jonathan turns, the ladder wobbles and Carl accidentally decapitates Jonathan. Clare rushes back to the box and makes her seventh wish – to go back to the morning her father found the box.

Clare is able to find the box moments before her father, preventing the tragic sequence of events. Clare goes to school and kisses a befuddled Ryan, says they are friends in the multiverse, and asks him to bury the box. She is then killed when she turns and inadvertently steps in front of Darcie's vehicle. The Yaoguai has indeed claimed her soul.

In a mid-credits scene, Ryan prepares to bury the music box, but becomes intrigued by the inscription about the seven wishes and decides to keep it.

Cast 

In addition, Jerry O'Connell has an uncredited cameo as a previous owner of the music box.

Themes 
Director John R. Leonetti summarized Wish Upon as different from similar "The Monkey's Paw"-esque stories for the depth of the character Clare, particularly her tough childhood and the inability to stop using the music box even as she realizes what it really does.

Production 
The film is loosely based on W. W. Jacobs' short story The Monkey's Paw. The film's screenplay was voted to the 2015 Black List. Catherine Hardwicke was originally planned to direct the film, but she later was removed from the project. Afterward, producer Sherryl Clark sent a draft of the script to John R. Leonetti; he explained that while he did enjoy the script, "I didn't completely jump on at first because I had other things going on." However, another draft sent by Clark four months later caught his eyeballs, and he took on directing duties from there. While most of the contents of the original drafts were seen in the final cut, there were alterations. A sequence where Carl almost gets hit by a truck, which referenced Billy Hitchcock's death in Final Destination (2000), was removed as the filmmakers ultimately didn't want to make a Final Destination-esque product. During filming, the scene of Jonathan in his car with a flat tire was pulled "right out of our ass" to serve as a diversion to Meredith's elevator death.

On July 27, 2016, it was announced that Wish Upon would be directed by John R. Leonetti. The film is produced by Sherryl Clark from her production company, Busted Shark Productions, and written by Barbara Marshall. In August 2016, Joey King was cast in the film's lead role, and on November 9, 2016, Ki Hong Lee was announced to have also joined. King was Leonetti's first choice for Clare Shannon, as the two previously worked together on The Conjuring (2013); and the director wanted to feature Shannon Purser in the film after seeing her in Stranger Things. The film began production in November 2016 in Toronto. Shot on an Arri Alexa at 3.4K resolution, Wish Upon was directed by Leonetti to look natural, departing from the stylized visual aesthetics of other horror films.

Release

Theatrical
The film's teaser trailer was released on February 9, 2017. The first trailer debuted on March 22, 2017, and the second trailer was released on May 22, 2017. Wish Upon was released in theaters on July 14, 2017, in the U.S., and July 28, 2017, in the U.K.

Home video
Wish Upon was released on DVD and Blu-ray in the United States on October 10, 2017. The Blu-ray also includes the director's Unrated Cut of the movie which is one minute longer and favoured by the director.

Marketing
Broad Green Pictures granted seven fan wishes submitted via the film's official website.

Reception

Box office
Wish Upon grossed $14.3 million in the United States and Canada, and $9.2 million in other territories, for a worldwide total of $23.5 million, against a production budget of $12 million.

In North America, Wish Upon was released alongside the opening of War for the Planet of the Apes, as well as the wide expansion of The Big Sick, and was projected to gross $8–10 million from 2,100 theaters in its opening weekend. It made $376,000 from Thursday night previews at 1,659 theaters and $2.3 million on its first day. It went on to debut to $5.5 million for its opening weekend, finishing seventh at the box office.

Critical response
The film received negative reviews from critics.  

Andrew Barker of Variety wrote: "By any normal standards, teen horror flick Wish Upon is a pretty bad movie. But its badness is of such a distinct and kooky character that it can’t help but exert an inadvertent charm."

References

External links
 
 

2017 films
2017 horror thriller films
2010s teen horror films
2017 horror films
2010s high school films
American high school films
American horror thriller films
American teen horror films
American supernatural horror films
American supernatural thriller films
Broad Green Pictures films
Films about wish fulfillment
Films directed by John R. Leonetti
Films shot in Toronto
Films scored by Tomandandy
Horror film remakes
Orion Pictures films
2010s English-language films
2010s American films